Pleromelloida is a genus of moths of the family Noctuidae.

Species
 Pleromelloida arizonata (Barnes & Benjamin, 1922)
 Pleromelloida bonuscula (J.B. Smith, 1898)
 Pleromelloida cinerea (J.B. Smith, 1904)
 Pleromelloida conserta (Grote, 1881)

References
Natural History Museum Lepidoptera genus database
Pleromelloida at funet

Cuculliinae